The following lists events that happened during 1961 in the Republic of Chile.

Incumbents
President of Chile: Jorge Alessandri

Events

January
31 January - The latest edition of the newspapers El Amigo del País de Copiapó and El Noticiero Huasquino de Vallenar circulate.

February
3 February - The Estadio Municipal Nelson Oyarzún Arenas is inaugurated, located in the city of Chillán of the local team Ñublense.
11-21 February - The second version of the Viña del Mar International Song Festival is held.

March
 5 March – Chilean parliamentary election, 1961, the Radical Party wins with 21.42% of the votes

April
3 April – LAN Chile Flight 210 crashes in the Andes The plane carrying the Club de Deportes Green Cross soccer team crashes in the Nevado de Longaví, Maule Region, killing all 24 people on board. 
17 April - Funerals are held for those killed in the Green Cross tragedy.

June
24 June - Raúl Silva Henríquez takes office as Archbishop of Santiago in the Archdiocese of Santiago.

July
July 11 - The commune of Antarctica is founded, in the current Magallanes Region

October
October 18 - The transmissions of TV Bolívar begin in Concepción, the first private television channel in the country and which broadcast in closed circuit and by cable due to the restrictions imposed by the government preventing the appearance of commercial television channels through an open signal.

Births
1 January – Andrea Tessa
9 January – Margot Kahl
20 January – Patricio Yáñez
24 January – Guido Girardi
31 January – Aldo Schiappacasse
26 April – José A. Santos
27 April – Mónica Regonesi
1 June – Rubén Espinoza
6 June – Tom Araya
1 July – Bastián Bodenhöfer
27 July – Harold Mayne-Nicholls
30 August – Leonel Contreras
17 September – Sergio Marchant (d. 2020)
29 September – Mariela Griffor
25 November – Ricardo Raineri
7 December – Pablo Simonetti
27 December – Fernando Díaz Seguel

Deaths
 25 May – Lenka Franulic (b. 1908)

References 

 
Years of the 20th century in Chile
Chile
1960s in Chile
Chile